The 1907 International Lawn Tennis Challenge was the seventh edition of what is now known as the Davis Cup. As defending champions, the British Isles team played host to the competition. After several years of more varied competition, only Australasia and the United States would challenge for the cup. Australasia won both ties, and became the third nation to win the cup. The ties were played at Worple Road (the former site of the All England Club) in Wimbledon, London, England from 13–24 July.

Final
Australasia vs. United States

Challenge Round
British Isles vs. Australasia

References

External links
Davis Cup official website
 A Very Serious Occupation – Tennis and Our First Davis Cup Win

Davis Cups by year
International Lawn Tennis Challenge
International Lawn Tennis Challenge
International Lawn Tennis
International Lawn Tennis
1907 in English tennis